Suporn Watanyusakul is a Thai plastic and reconstructive surgeon. He is considered by some to be a world leader in surgical procedures for transgender individuals. He performs facial feminization surgery and  male-to-female (MTF) sex reassignment surgery (SRS).

Suporn's method differs from most MTF SRS in that he does not use the penile inversion method. He instead constructs the vaginal canal with scrotal skin and uses the penile tissues for the labia, clitoral hood, and other external features.  A full thickness inguinal (groin crease) skin graft is used for the vaginal lining in cases where inadequate scrotal skin is available. In some cases, small parts of the urethra have been used, along with other body parts. Dr. Suporn's method generally yields a deeper neovagina than the more standard penile inversion technique and positions the areas of greatest sensitivity at the same locations as on cisgender women. Suporn's form of vaginoplasty has been referred to as the Suporn technique.  Dr. Suporn always retains the Cowper's gland or bulbourethral gland. In transgender females this bulbourethral gland is responsible for the thin, colourless lubricating fluid that is secreted during sexual arousal, which also adds to the natural lubrication.

See also
 List of transgender-related topics
 Plastic surgery
 Vaginoplasty

References

External links
 Suporn Watanyusakul (Chonburi, Thailand)

Suporn Watanyusakul
Surgeons specializing in transgender medicine
Year of birth missing (living people)
Suporn Watanyusakul
Living people